The Azteca 2000 Tournament was a minor international football competition, which took place in the summer of 1985 in Mexico City.

Host nation Mexico, England and West Germany participated in the tournament, and matches took place at the Estadio Azteca. The three-nation mini-tournament was arranged as a preparatory exercise for Mexico, who would host the 1986 FIFA World Cup final tournament the following year.

The first game of this tournament (England vs Mexico) was also the final game of the Mexico City Cup Tournament.

Results

This match also counted as the last match of the 1985 Ciudad de México Cup Tournament.

Table

External links 
Azteca 2000 Tournament results & table

1985
1984–85 in Mexican football
1984–85 in English football
1984–85 in German football